Rebecca Adlington  (born 17 February 1989) is a British former competitive swimmer who specialised in freestyle events in international competition. She won two gold medals at the 2008 Summer Olympics in the 400-metre freestyle and 800-metre freestyle, breaking the 19-year-old world record of Janet Evans in the 800-metre final. Adlington was Britain's first Olympic swimming champion since 1988, and the first British swimmer to win two Olympic gold medals since 1908. After winning her first World Championship gold over 800 metres in 2011, along with silver in the 400 metres at the same meet, she won bronze medals in both the women's 400-metre and 800-metre freestyle events in the 2012 Summer Olympics in London.

On 5 February 2013, retired from all competitive swimming, at the age of 23. Since retiring as a competitor, she has worked for BBC TV as a swimming pundit at the Olympic Games and World Aquatics Championships, and made various other media appearances. Adlington is also one of a number of former sports stars behind a commercial group dedicated to providing coaching and leisure outlets.

Early life and education
Adlington was born in Mansfield, Nottinghamshire, where she attended The Brunts School. In 2009, she was one of 94 from "the world of aquatics" to benefit from the Advanced Apprenticeship in Sporting Excellence award (AASE), intended to recognise potential elite athletes with the opportunity for integrated academic achievement whilst continuing with training for competition.

Adlington started swimming with Sherwood Colliery Swimming Club, and was selected for the Nottinghamshire County Elite Squad (Nova Centurion Swimming Club). She swam in local swimming leagues for Nottingham Leander Swimming Club, having taken part in the National Speedo 'B' Final in May 2010. Adlington's great-uncle was Terry Adlington, former goalkeeper with Derby County. and she is a keen Derby supporter.

Commercial coaching and leisure outlets 
Together with former sports personalities Steve Parry and Adrian Turner, Adlington is part of Total Swimming Group, a commercial group dedicated to providing coaching and leisure outlets. JD Sports bought-in during 2022, acquiring a 60% stake. Subsequent to COVID-19 lockdown and the energy crisis with 2021–2023 global energy crisis, Adlington joined with approximately 200 others forming a pressure group calling for the UK energy subsidy, the energy price cap ending by April 2023, to be continued to help the energy-hungry swimming pools to survive potential closures.

Personal life
In 2005, Adlington's sister was affected by encephalitis, an inflammation of the brain. Her sister recovered over time, but its impact inspired Adlington to say in 2012: "It made me more determined. It makes me train harder". Adlington became an Ambassador of the Encephalitis Society in 2009, to help raise awareness of the illness.

In 2009, comedian Frankie Boyle was censured by the BBC Trust's Editorial Standards Committee for breaching guidelines by using "humiliating and offensive" remarks with "unnecessary innuendo" during a 2008 edition of Mock The Week broadcast on BBC 2, when he jibed at Adlington's appearance. Adlington's mother criticised the BBC for making the ruling public, which had caused her daughter more distress.

In 2014, Adlington married former swimmer Harry Needs. The couple had a daughter together, born in 2015. In March 2016, Adlington announced her separation from Needs.

On 4 March 2021, Adlington and her boyfriend, Andy Parsons, announced the birth of their son. She announced on 5 September 2021 that the couple had married. In August 2022, she suffered a miscarriage and underwent an emergency surgery.

Competitive career
Adlington represented Great Britain in the 2008 Summer Olympics, competing in the 400-metre freestyle and 800-metre freestyle events.  She was also scheduled to swim in the 4×200-metre freestyle relay but was rested in the heat and the team failed to qualify for the final.  In the heats of the 400-metre freestyle, she broke the Commonwealth record with a time of 4:02.24. On 11 August 2008, she won an Olympic gold medal in the same event, with a time of 4:03.22, overtaking Katie Hoff of the United States in the last 20 metres. She was the first woman to win swimming gold for Great Britain since Anita Lonsbrough in 1960. She was the first British swimmer to win more than one gold medal at a single Olympic Games since Henry Taylor won three in 1908.

In 2009, Adlington said she suffered with the expectation placed on her ahead of the World Aquatics Championships in Rome, and although she swam a personal best she won only bronze in the 400-metre freestyle.  She added a second bronze in the 4×200-metre freestyle. In her favourite event, the 800-metre freestyle she gained fourth place.

In 2010, Adlington won the 400-metre freestyle at the European Swimming Championships in Budapest but again failed to win a medal in her favoured 800-metre freestyle, finishing seventh. She won bronze as part of the 4×200-metre freestyle relay team.

At the Commonwealth Games in New Delhi, she won a "bonus" bronze medal in the 200-metre freestyle, and was part of the English record setting 4×200-metre freestyle relay team that also won bronze. In the 800-metre freestyle, Adlington led from start to finish to win her first Commonwealth Games gold medal. In the 400-metre freestyle, Adlington won comfortably to earn a second gold medal and repeat her Olympic double.  She ended the season ranked No. 2 in the 400-metre freestyle and No. 1 in the 800-metre freestyle.

At the 2011 World Aquatics Championships, Adlington won the 800-metre freestyle gold medal, beating Lotte Friis over the final 50 metres, and silver in the 400-metre freestyle behind world record-holder Federica Pellegrini of Italy.

At the 2012 Summer Olympics in London, Adlington won bronze in the 400-metre freestyle in a time of 4:03.01. and another bronze in the women's 800-metre freestyle in a time of 8:20.32. After the Games, Adlington said that she would no longer undertake the 800-metre race, and would not compete at the 2016 Summer Olympics in Rio.

Records set
Adlington set a new British, Commonwealth, European and Olympic record of 8:18.06 in the preliminary heats of the women's 800-metre freestyle on 14 August 2008. She went on to win the Olympic 800-metre freestyle final on 16 August 2008 in a world record time of 8:14.10, her second gold of the tournament, a full six seconds ahead of the silver medallist, and two seconds ahead of the former world record which had been set by Janet Evans when Adlington was 6 months old. At the time, this was swimming's longest standing world record.

Personal bests and records held
Long course (50 m)

Short course (25 m)

Recognition

Adlington was welcomed home to Mansfield in August 2008 by thousands of people who lined the streets to applaud as she passed by in an open top bus and then appeared at a ceremony at Mansfield Town Hall.

In 2008 after her post-Olympic homecoming, in a special ceremony at Mansfield's Civic Centre headquarters, Adlington was presented with a pair of gold-coloured Jimmy Choo shoes by Tony Egginton, then the executive mayor.

In November 2008, Adlington was named as the Sports Journalists' Association's Sportswoman of the Year, receiving her trophy at a ceremony in the City of London from the Princess Royal, herself a former winner of that award. On 14 December 2008, she was voted third in the BBC Sports Personality of the Year award.

Adlington was appointed Officer of the Order of the British Empire (OBE) in the 2009 New Year Honours list, followed in December 2009 by an honorary degree as Master of Arts from the University of Nottingham in recognition of her outstanding contribution to British sport.

The Sherwood Swimming Baths in Adlington's hometown of Mansfield, where she began swimming as a child, was renamed the Rebecca Adlington Swimming Centre when it reopened after refurbishment in January 2010. The Yates Bar in Mansfield was renamed the Adlington Arms in her honour.

The 2012 Olympic torch relay was routed through Mansfield Woodhouse where it was affected by a heavy thunderstorm before a scheduled lunch break at the Rebecca Adlington Swimming Centre.

In 2013 soon after her retirement from competition, Adlington was named as the inaugural inductee into Nottinghamshire County Council's Roll of Honour.

One of the Class 395 high-speed trains operated by Southeastern, used to provide a 140-mph London-to-Kent link and the Javelin shuttle service for visitors to the 2012 London Olympic Games, was named after Adlington. Several other British Olympians also received this honour.

Tram 231 on the Nottingham Tram system was named after Adlington in 2016.

Television
Adlington was a guest panellist on the ITV lunchtime chat show Loose Women on 25 March, 17 April and 22 May 2014. She was a contestant in Series 3 of The Jump, but withdrew on 7 February 2016 having dislocated her shoulder during training.

At the 2016 Summer Olympics in Rio, Adlington formed part of the BBC presenting team for the swimming events, along with Helen Skelton and Mark Foster. She repeated this role at the 2017 World Aquatics Championships, the 2018 European Championships, and the 2020 Summer Olympics in Tokyo among others.

I'm a Celebrity...

Adlington participated in the thirteenth series of I'm a Celebrity...Get Me Out of Here!, which began airing on 17 November 2013 and was held in Australia. She finished in 6th place, being voted out by the public on 6 December 2013.

Guest appearances
The Charlotte Church Show (28 August 2008) – Guest
All Star Family Fortunes (18 September 2010) – Contestant
A League of Their Own (2 November 2012) – Panellist
I Love My Country (14 September 2013) – Guest
Celebrity Come Dine with Me (16 December 2013) – Contestant
Who Wants to Be a Millionaire? (19 December 2013) – Contestant, with Kian Egan 
The Chase: Celebrity Special (28 December 2013) – Contestant
A Question of Sport: Super Saturday (12 July 2014) – Guest
8 Out of 10 Cats (13 October 2014) – Guest
Desert Island Discs BBC Radio 4 (14 June 2015) – Interviewed at length as the guest 'castaway'
Celebrity MasterChef (16 August 2017) – Contestant

See also
 List of Olympic medalists in swimming (women)
 List of World Aquatics Championships medalists in swimming (women)
 List of Commonwealth Games medallists in swimming (women)
 World record progression 800 metres freestyle

References

External links

 Official Rebecca Adlington Website
 British Olympic Association athlete profile
 British Swimming athlete profile
 British Swimming results and rankings database entry

|-

1989 births
Living people
Sportspeople from Mansfield
Commonwealth Games bronze medallists for England
Commonwealth Games gold medallists for England
English Olympic medallists
English female swimmers
European Aquatics Championships medalists in swimming
British female freestyle swimmers
World record setters in swimming
Laureus World Sports Awards winners
Medalists at the FINA World Swimming Championships (25 m)
Medalists at the 2012 Summer Olympics
Medalists at the 2008 Summer Olympics
Officers of the Order of the British Empire
Olympic bronze medallists for Great Britain
Olympic gold medallists for Great Britain
Olympic bronze medalists in swimming
Olympic swimmers of Great Britain
Swimmers at the 2008 Summer Olympics
Swimmers at the 2010 Commonwealth Games
Swimmers at the 2012 Summer Olympics
World Aquatics Championships medalists in swimming
Olympic gold medalists in swimming
Commonwealth Games medallists in swimming
I'm a Celebrity...Get Me Out of Here! (British TV series) participants
Medallists at the 2010 Commonwealth Games